Djorf Torba Dam is a dam in Kenadsa District, Béchar Province, Algeria, crossing the Oued Guir about  west of the capital, Béchar. It is used for the purposes of irrigation and water supply. The area around the head of the dam features a number of notable ancient monuments. The dam has resulted in a significant reduction in the flow of Oued Guir and Oued Saoura in locations downstream of the dam.

References 

Dams in Algeria
Buildings and structures in Béchar Province